Ramazan Magomedov (born in Dagestan) whose second name is also sometimes spelt Magamedau is a Belarusian amateur boxer who qualified for the 2008 Olympics at light-heavyweight.

The elusive Magomedov lost to Tony Jeffries at the 2007  World Championships.

He beat Kenneth Egan at the first qualifier, though, and punched his ticket to Beijing where he was edged out in his first bout by Ramadan Yasser.

He currently boxes for the World Series Boxing team Azerbaijan Baku Fires, with a record of 12 wins and 0 losses .

External links
First Qualifier

Light-heavyweight boxers
Living people
Boxers at the 2008 Summer Olympics
Olympic boxers of Belarus
Belarusian male boxers
Year of birth missing (living people)